Werner Freers (born 19 July 1954, Hämelerwald, Lehrte, Germany)  is a German Army general and served as Chief of Staff of the Supreme Headquarters Allied Powers Europe from 2012 to 2017.

References

Generals of the German Army
1954 births
Commanders of the Legion of Merit
Recipients of the Cross of the Order of Merit of the Federal Republic of Germany
Foreign recipients of the Legion of Merit
Living people
Military personnel from Lower Saxony